Shawcross  is an English surname. Notable people with this surname include the following:

 Arthur Shawcross (1945–2008), American serial killer
 Christopher Nyholm Shawcross (1905–1973), English lawyer and politician; brother of Hartley Shawcross
 Conrad Shawcross (born 1977), English artist; son of William Shawcross
 David Shawcross (born 1941), former English footballer
 Hartley Shawcross, Baron Shawcross (1902–2003), English lawyer and politician
 Neil Shawcross (born 1940), English artist
 Ryan Shawcross (born 1987), English footballer
 Val Shawcross, English Labour Party politician
 William Shawcross (born 1946), English writer, journalist and commentator, and charity administrator; son of Hartley Shawcross

English-language surnames